Charles T. Willis (February 7, 1841 – 1921) was an American politician from New York.

Life
He was born on February 7, 1841, in Waterloo, Seneca County, New York. He attended the common schools, and then became a miller, and later also a farmer, in Tyrone, Schuyler County, New York. He married Emma Jane Williams (1847–1897), and they had several children.

Willis was a member of the New York State Assembly (Schuyler Co.) in 1890 and 1891.

In August 1898, he was nominated in the 40th senatorial district Republican convention with the votes of the delegates from Schuyler and Tompkins counties, defeating Judson A. Gibson who was backed by J. Sloat Fassett and received the votes of Chemung County. At the election in November, Willis defeated the Democratic Ex-Assemblyman J. Franklin Barnes. Willis was a member of the New York State Senate (40th D.) in 1899 and 1900.

He died in 1921, and was buried at the Union Cemetery in Tyrone, New York.

Sources

1841 births
1921 deaths
Republican Party New York (state) state senators
People from Schuyler County, New York
Republican Party members of the New York State Assembly
People from Waterloo, New York